Listed below are articles about or related to Andorra, arranged alphabetically:

A 
- Administrative divisions of Andorra
- .ad
- Acadèmia Valenciana de la Llengua
- Acadèmia Valenciana de la Llengua
- Aixovall
- Albert Celades
- Albert Pintat
- Albert Salvadó
- Alex Antor
- Alguerese
- Ana Arce
- Andorra
- Andorra at the 1976 Summer Olympics
- Andorra at the 1980 Summer Olympics
- Andorra at the 1996 Summer Olympics
- Andorra at the 2000 Summer Olympics
- Andorra at the 2004 Summer Olympics
- Andorra at the 2006 Winter Olympics
- Andorra at the 2006 Winter Paralympics
- Andorra at the 2010 Winter Olympics
- Andorra in the Eurovision Song Contest
- Andorra la Vella
- Andorra la Vella
- Andorra national basketball team
- Andorra national football team
- Andorra National Library
- Andorra national rugby union team
- Andorra Telecom
- Andorran Cup
- Andorran Democratic Centre
- Andorran diner
- Andorran euro coins
- Andorran First Division
- Andorran Football Federation
- Andorran nationality law
- Andorran Olympic Committee
- Andorran parliamentary election, 2001
- Andorran parliamentary election, 2005
- Andorran passport
- Andorran Workers' Union
- Ants of Andorra
- Area of Andorra
- Arinsal
- Army of Andorra
- Association for the Defense of Nature (ADN) in Andorra
- Atlètic Club d'Escaldes

B 
- BC Andorra
- Bearded vulture
- Boris Skossyreff

C 
- .cat
- Cabinet of Andorra
- Canillo
- Canillo
- Capital of Andorra: Andorra la Vella
- Capital punishment in Andorra
- Catalan Countries
- Catalan dialect examples
- Catalan grammar
- Catalan language
- Catalan language/Swadesh list
- Catalan phonology and orthography
- Catalan Wikipedia
- Central Catalan
- Central European Time
- Century 21 (political party)
- Climate of Andorra
- Coat of arms of Andorra
- Coma Pedrosa
- Commander-in-chief:
- Common genet
- Communications in Andorra
- Conjugation of auxiliary Catalan verbs
- Conjugation of regular Catalan verbs
- Constitution of Andorra
- Consulate of the Sea
- Council of Europe (CE)
- COVID-19 pandemic in Andorra
- Culture of Andorra
- Currency of Andorra

D 
- Democratic Party (Andorra)
- Democratic Renewal (Andorra)
- Democrats for Andorra
- Demographics of Andorra
- Diocese of Urgell
- Diplomatic missions of Andorra

E 
- Eastern Catalan
- Economy of Andorra
- Education in Andorra
- El Gran Carlemany
- El Periòdic d'Andorra
- El Serrat
- Elections in Andorra
- Encamp
- Encamp
- Environmental issues in Andorra
- Escaldes-Engordany
- Escaldes-Engordany
- Estadi Comunal d'Andorra la Vella
- Estadio Comunal de Aixovall
- Estanys de Baiau
- Eurasia
- Europe
- European microstate
- Extreme points of Andorra

F 
- FC Encamp
- FC Rànger's
- FC Santa Coloma
- Federació Andorrana de Rugby
- Flag of Andorra
- Football in Andorra
- Foreign relations of Andorra
- Form of government: parliamentary representative democracy
- Freedom of religion in Andorra
- French franc

G 
- General Council (Andorra)
- General Council of the Valleys
- Geography of Andorra
- Geology of Andorra
- Government of Andorra
- Gran Valira
- Greens of Andorra
- Guillem d'Areny-Plandolit

H 
- Head of government: Prime Minister of Andorra, Jaume Bartumeu
- Head of state: Co-Princes of Andorra:
- History of Andorra
- Hocine Haciane
- Human rights in Andorra

I 
- Iberian naming customs
- Iberian Peninsula
- Ildefons Lima
- Institut d'Estudis Catalans
- Inter Club d'Escaldes
- International rankings of Andorra
- Internet in Andorra
- Internet country code top-level domain: .ad
- Islam in Andorra
- ISO 4217: EUR
- ISO country codes: AD, AND, 020
- ISO region codes: See ISO 3166-2:AD

J 
- Jacques Chirac
- Jaume Bartumeu
- Joan Enric Vives i Sicilia, Bishop of La Seu d'Urgell, Spain
- Judaism in Andorra
- Jugarem A Estimar-Nos
- Julian Vila Coma
- Justí Guitart i Vilardebó

K 
- Koldo Álvarez

L 
- La Massana
- La Massana
- La Mirada Interior
- La Seu d'Urgell
- landlocked country
- Languages of Andorra
- Lauredian Union
- Law enforcement in Andorra
- LGBT rights in Andorra
- Liberal Party of Andorra
-Lídia Armengol i Vila
-List of ants of Andorra
- Lusitanos

M 
- Manuel Sanchis i Guarner
- Marc Bernaus
- Marc Forné Molné
- Marca Hispanica
- Marta Roure
- Media in Andorra
- Melissandre Fuentes
- Military history of Andorra
- Military of Andorra
- Military ranks of Andorra
- Ministry of Defence of Andorra
- Municipalities of Andorra
- Music of Andorra

N 
- Name of Andorra
- National anthem of Andorra
- Navy of Andorra
- Nicolas Sarkozy
- Normes de Castelló
- North-Western Catalan
- Northern Catalan

O 
- Òmnium Cultural
- Ordino
- Ordino

P 
- Parishes of Andorra
- Parliament of Andorra (unicameral): General Council of the Valleys
- Parochial Union of Independents Group
- Parochial Union of Ordino
- Pas de la Casa
- Patrimoni Cultural
- Police Corps of Andorra
- Political scandals of Andorra
- Politics of Andorra
- Pompeu Fabra
- Population of Andorra: 71,822 (2007) - 194th most populous country
- Postal codes in Andorra
- Postal services in Andorra
- President of France
- Principat
- Prostitution in Andorra
- Public holidays in Andorra
- Pyrenean chamois
- Pyrenees
- Pyrenees mountain range

R 
- Radio Andorra
- Ràdio i Televisió d'Andorra
- Rail transport in Andorra
- Ramon Iglesias i Navarri
- Ramon Llull
- Ramón Malla Call
- Religion in Andorra
- Renewal Party of Ordino
- Ribagorçan
- Roman Catholicism in Andorra

S 
- Sant Julià de Lòria
- Sant Julià de Lòria
- Scouting in Andorra
- Sense Tu
- Social Democratic Party (Andorra)
- Softcatalà
- Soldeu
- Southern Europe
- Spanish language
- Spanish peseta
- Special forces of Andorra
- Supreme Court of Andorra: Superior Court of Justice

T 
- Taxation in Andorra
- Television in Andorra
- Tirant lo Blanc
- Pere Joan Tomas Sogero
- Tourism in Andorra
- Transport in Andorra

U 
- UE Sant Julià
- Unió de Radioaficionats Andorrans
- Unió Sindical d'Andorra
- Union, Common Sense and Progress
- United States-Andorra relations
- Unity and Renewal
- Universitat d'Andorra

V 
- Valencian
- Vehicle registration plates of Andorra
- Visa policy of Andorra
- Voluntaris per la Llengua

W 
- Weak pronouns in Catalan
- Western capercaillie
- Western Catalan
- Wildlife of Andorra

Lists 
- Airports in Andorra
- List of Andorrans
- Birds of Andorra
- List of birds on stamps of Andorra (French)
- List of birds on stamps of Andorra (Spanish)
- Cities of Andorra
- List of Co-Princes of Andorra
- Economic rank, by nominal GDP (2007): 147th (one hundred and forty seventh)
- Diplomatic missions in Andorra
- Mammals of Andorra
- List of people on stamps of Andorra
- List of political parties in Andorra
- Political parties in Andorra
- World Heritage Sites in Andorra

See also 
 Outline of Andorra

Andorra